Lucas Ezequiel Agüero (born 28 April 1997) is an Argentine professional footballer who plays as a forward for Huracán Las Heras.

Career
Agüero's career began with Godoy Cruz. He was promoted into their senior squad in the 2017–18 Primera División campaign, a season in which he made his first professional appearances in after being substituted on during fixtures with Arsenal de Sarandí and Estudiantes in March 2018. He was later an unused substitute against Tigre in May, as Godoy Cruz finished 2nd in the Primera División table. Agüero spent the 2019–20 season out on loan in Primera B Nacional with All Boys. He made just four appearances, partly due to injury. In August 2020, Agüero joined Torneo Federal A's Huracán Las Heras.

Career statistics
.

References

External links

1997 births
Living people
Sportspeople from Mendoza Province
Argentine footballers
Association football forwards
Argentine Primera División players
Primera Nacional players
Godoy Cruz Antonio Tomba footballers
All Boys footballers